Public data may refer to:
Open data
any data that inadvertently becomes public affecting information privacy

Open data
Information privacy